Yvette Chauviré (22 April 1917 – 19 October 2016) was a French prima ballerina and actress. She is often described as France's greatest ballerina, and was the coach of prima ballerinas Sylvie Guillem and Marie-Claude Pietragalla. She was awarded the Légion d'Honneur in 1964.

Early life
Yvonne Chauviré was born in Paris on 22 April 1917. Aged 10, in 1927, she entered the Paris Opera Ballet school, and at the age of 12 she was noticed for her performance in the children's ballet L'Eventail de Jeanne ("Jeanne's Fan"). When she was 13, she was invited to join the opera's ballet company.

Career
Chauviré rose through the ranks of dancers at the Paris Opera Ballet, becoming principal dancer in 1937 and étoile, the highest rank, in 1941.

She was the star of a number of experimental works choreographed by the company's director Serge Lifar, including Alexandre le Grand, Istar, Suite en Blanc and Les Mirages. Lifar also encouraged her to study with two Russian choreographers Boris Kniaseff and Victor Gsovsky, who influenced her style towards lyricism and away from her hard-lined academic training.

Although never a pupil of Carlotta Zambelli's, Chauviré later admitted that she spent a great deal of time watching Zambelli teach and learnt to copy her techniques and movements and then to make them her own.

Lifar was forced to leave the company in 1945 after being accused of supporting Germany during World War II and the following year Chauviré also left, following Lifar to his newly formed company, the Nouveau Ballet de Monte-Carlo. In 1947 both Lifar and Chauviré returned to the Paris Opera Ballet; however, Chauviré left again in 1949 due to contractual disagreements with the company over her freedom to dance with other companies. She performed in a range of productions, including two made by her former teacher Gsovsky: Grand pas classique, for the Ballets des Champs-Elysées, and La Dame aux camélias, for the Berlin Ballet.

In 1953 the Paris Opera Ballet agreed to a more flexible contract and she returned to the company but continued to dance as a guest performer with companies in Europe, the United States, South Africa and Latin America.  She often danced with Rudolf Nureyev, who described her as a "legend", and also danced with Māris Liepa and Erik Bruhn. During this time she widened her range of roles and began to perform in more classical productions such as Giselle, Sleeping Beauty and The Nutcracker. The role of Giselle became a particular passion for Chauviré, and she considered it her signature piece.

Chauviré retired from the Paris Opera Ballet in 1956, but continued to appear with the company until 1972. She was also co-director of the Paris Opera Ballet school from 1963 to 1968, and taught Sylvie Guillem and Marie-Claude Pietragalla. She choreographed some short ballets herself. In 1970, she became Director of the International Academy of Dance, in Paris.

In a 1989 interview, she characterised contemporary style as becoming "more and more slipshod", and criticised the fashion for "extreme" ballet movements as risking injury to the dancer. She said she had tried during her career, "to simplify, within the greatest technical difficulty".

In 1992, Chauviré served as an inaugural juror for the International Dance Association's Prix Benois de la Danse competition.

Publications
Chauviré published two autobiographies in her lifetime: in 1960, a book titled Je suis ballerine, and in 1997, with Gerard Mannoni, Yvette Chauviré – Autobiographie.

Film roles
In 1937, Chauviré performed in Jean Benoît-Lévy's film  La Mort du Cygne ("The Death of the Swan"), which told the story of a young girl who aspires to become a ballet dancer. The film received the Grand Prix du Film Francais at the 1937 Paris Exposition and was released in the United States the following year under the title Ballerina. Chauviré became a star in the United States, and was featured on the cover of Life magazine in December 1938. In 1988, the film was rediscovered and screened in New York with Chauviré as a commentator.

Chauviré was also the subject of a documentary film produced by Dominique Delouche, Yvette Chauviré: une étoile pour l'example, which was screened at the Cannes Film Festival in 1983. The film shows coaching sessions between Chauviré and younger ballerinas, such as Dominique Khalfouni, as well as archival footage of her performances.

Honours
 Chevalier of Ordre of the Legion of Honnour, in 1964.
 Commander of Ordre of the Legion of Honnour, 24 mars 1988. (March 24th, 1988)
 Grand officer of Ordre of the Legion of Honnour, 13 juillet 2015. (July 13th, 2015)
 Commander of National Order of Merit,  22 juin 1994. (June 22nd, 1994)
 Grand cross of National Order of Merit,  10 novembre 1997. (November 10th, 1997)
 Commander of Ordre of Arts and Letters.

Personal life
Chauviré was married to a Russian artist, Constantin Nepokoitchitsky (known as Constantin Nepo), who died in 1976. She died at her home in Paris on 19 October 2016, aged 99.

Notable published works
 Je suis ballerine (1960)

References

External links
• Marie-Claude Pietragalla & Yvette Chauviré: Les Deux Pigeons YouTube video; retrieved 22 January 2016.

1917 births
2016 deaths
20th-century French ballet dancers
Artists from Paris
Burials at Père Lachaise Cemetery
Commandeurs of the Ordre des Arts et des Lettres
French autobiographers
French ballerinas
French ballet masters
Grand Cross of the Ordre national du Mérite
Grand Officiers of the Légion d'honneur
Paris Opera Ballet étoiles
Prima ballerinas
Prix Benois de la Danse jurors